Cato typically refers to either Cato the Elder or Cato the Younger, both of the Porcii Catones family of Rome. 

It may also refer to:

People

Ancient Romans
 Porcii Catones, a plebeian family at Ancient Rome
 Cato the Elder (Cato Maior) or "the Censor" (Marcus Porcius Cato 234–149 BC), Roman statesman
 Marcus Porcius Cato Licinianus, son of Cato the Elder by his first wife Licinia, jurist
 Marcus Porcius Cato, son of Cato Licinianus, consul 118 BC, died in Africa in the same year -->
 Gaius Porcius Cato, son of Cato Licinianus, consul 114 BC
 Marcus Porcius Cato Salonianus, son of Cato the Elder by his second wife Salonia, (born 154 BC, when his father had completed his eightieth year)
 Marcus Porcius Cato, son of Cato Salonianus and father of Cato the Younger
 Cato the Younger (Cato Minor) "Cato of Utica" (Marcus Porcius Catō Uticēnsis 95–46 BC), politician and statesman in the late Roman Republic
 Marcus Porcius Cato (son of Cato the Younger), fell at the Battle of Philippi, 42 BC
 Lucius Porcius Cato, son of Cato Salonianus, consul 89 BC, killed during the Social War (91–87 BC)
 Dionysius Cato, 3rd or 4th century AD author of Distichs of Cato

Others
 Cato (surname)
 Cato (given name)
 Jemmy, also known as "Cato", the leader of the Stono Rebellion, a 1739 slave revolt in South Carolina

Pseudonym
 Cato, the pseudonym used in the 1720s by the authors of Cato's Letters, i.e. John Trenchard and Thomas Gordon
 Cato the anti-Federalist, pseudonym for an American author of the Anti-Federalist Papers in the late 1780s, probably the politician George Clinton
 Cato, the pseudonym for the authors of the 1940s polemic Guilty Men

Fictional characters
 Cato Fong, Inspector Clouseau's manservant in the Pink Panther movies
 Cato, a tribute in The Hunger Games
 Quintus Licinius Cato, in Simon Scarrow’s Eagles of the Empire series
 Cato Weeksbooth, in the Terra Ignota series by Ada Palmer

Places

Australia
 Cato Bank, the bank that contains the Cato Reef
 Cato Island, an island in the Cato Reef
 Cato Reef, a reef in the Coral Sea
 Cato Trough, a trough in the Coral Sea

United States
 Cato, Indiana, an unincorporated community
 Cato, Kansas, an unincorporated community
 Cato Township, Michigan
 Cato, Missouri, an unincorporated community
 Cato (town), New York
 Cato (village), New York
 Cato, Tennessee, an unincorporated community in Trousdale County
 Cato, Wisconsin, a town
 Cato (community), Wisconsin, an unincorporated community

Literature
 Distichs of Cato, or simply Cato, a Latin collection of proverbial wisdom and morality by Dionysius Cato from the 3rd or 4th century AD
 Cato, a Tragedy, an 18th century drama by Joseph Addison

Ships
 , three Royal Navy vessels
 Cato (1800 ship), an English merchant ship sunk on the Great Barrier Reef in 1803
 Cato (1807 ship), a merchant ship which foundered in 1841

Technology
 CATO, an acronym used in rocketry, for Catastrophe At Take Off
 CATO, an acronym for Catapult Assisted take-off
 Corazón Artificial Total Ortotópico (Spanish for Orthotopic Total Artificial Heart) invented by Juan Giambruno

Other uses
 Cato Corporation, an American fashion retailer
 Cato Networks, an Israeli network security company
 Cato Institute, an American libertarian think tank
 Cato, a South Devon Railway Eagle class 4-4-0ST steam locomotive

See also
 Catto (disambiguation)
 Kato (disambiguation)